Raucous was a live, half an hour, RMITV program broadcast on C31 Melbourne featuring youth-oriented segments, arts reviews, comedy skits, interviews, street talks and live music. It was co-hosted by Lyndon Horsburgh and featured segments with Hamish and Andy's Hamish Blake and Andy Lee. The show debuted on Thursday 8 February 2001.

References

Australian community access television shows
2001 Australian television series debuts
English-language television shows
RMITV productions
Television shows set in Melbourne
Australian television talk shows
Australian television sketch shows
Australian variety television shows
Children's sketch comedy